Netechma cuneifera is a species of moth of the family Tortricidae. It is endemic to Ecuador (Carchi Province).

The ground colour of the forewings is white with a few black and yellowish dots. The markings are black. The hindwings are whitish creamy, spotted with pale brownish creamy. They are white at the base.

References

External links

Moths described in 2002
Endemic fauna of Ecuador
cuneifera
Moths of South America
Taxa named by Józef Razowski